Private William Edgar Holmes VC (26 June 1895 − 9 October 1918) was a British Army soldier and an English recipient of the Victoria Cross (VC), the highest and most prestigious award for gallantry in the face of the enemy that can be awarded to British and Commonwealth forces. A soldier with the Grenadier Guards during the First World War, he was posthumously awarded the VC for his actions on 9 October 1918, during the Hundred Days Offensive.

Early life
Born on 26 June 1895 in the village of Wood Stanway, in Gloucestershire, William Edgar Holmes was the son of a timber worker, James Holmes, who worked on the Stanway Estate, and his wife Ellen Holmes . He was educated at Church Stanway and on completing his schooling, he joined his father in working on the Stanway Estate.

In July 1913, Holmes enlisted in the Gloucestershire Regiment of the British Army. Before the year was out, he transferred to the Grenadier Guards and was posted to its 2nd Battalion.

First World War
On the outbreak of the First World War in August 1914, Holmes' battalion was part of the British Expeditionary Force (BEF) sent to France. He saw action in the Battle of Mons and at the First Battle of Ypres. After suffering frostbite in the winter of 1914, he was medically evacuated to England for treatment; this saw two toes being amputated.

Holmes returned to his unit in 1915. As part of the Guards Division, the battalion was engaged in several battles on the Western Front, including the Battles of Loos, the Somme, Cambrai, and Arras. In the final stages of the war, it advanced against the Hindenburg Line.

On 9 October 1918, Holmes' battalion was advancing towards the villages of Cattenières and Estourmel when it was held up by machine-gun fire. While under heavy fire, Holmes retrieved two wounded men. While assisting a third wounded soldier he himself was wounded. He remained in the frontlines until he was shot in the throat and died of his wounds. Cattenières was captured the following day. For his actions of 9 October, Holmes was awarded the Victoria Cross (VC). The VC, instituted in 1856, was the highest award for valour that could be bestowed on a soldier of the British Empire. The citation for Holmes' VC read: 

Holmes is buried at Carnieres Communal Cemetery Extension, a cemetery administered by the Commonwealth War Graves Commission, in Carnieres, to the east of Cambrai.

Victoria Cross

King  George V presented Holmes' VC to his parents on 29 March 1919, in a ceremony at Buckingham Palace. He was also entitled to the 1914 Star with clasp, the British War Medal, and the Victory Medal. His medals were purchased by the Grenadier Guards in 1985 and are displayed at The Guards Museum, located at Wellington Barracks in London.

On 9 October 2018, the centenary of Holmes' death, the Lord-Lieutenant of Gloucester, Dame Janet Trotter, unveiled a VC Stone to honour Holmes at St George's Church, in Didbrook, Gloucestershire. His name is recorded on the Roll of Honour inside the church.

References

Bibliography

External links
Medal entitlement of Private William Edgar Holmes

1895 births
1918 deaths
English amputees
Burials in France
British World War I recipients of the Victoria Cross
Grenadier Guards soldiers
British Army personnel of World War I
British military personnel killed in World War I
People from Stanway, Gloucestershire
Gloucestershire Regiment soldiers
British Army recipients of the Victoria Cross
Military personnel from Gloucestershire